Jewish Communist Union (Poalei Zion), Komverband was the name taken by the Left World Union of Poalei Zion in 1921. Komverband had members in Russia, Lithuania, Latvia, Austria, Italy, Poland and other countries. In 1922 Komverband shifted its headquarters from Vienna to Danzig, in preparation for a party conference. At that conference the communists were expelled from the organization, and the Left Poalei Zion retook its former shape.

Section of Komverband included:
Jewish Communist Party of Austria
Jewish Communist Party (Poalei Zion)

See also
 Jewish Communist Labour Party (Poalei Zion)
 Jewish Communist Party (Poalei Zion)
 Jewish Communist Party — Poalei Zion, section of the Palestine Communist Party
 Mifleget Poale Zion VeHaHugim HaMarksistim beEretz Yisrael
 Poale Zion

References
East European Jewish Affairs, Vol. 34, No. 2, Winter 2004, pp. 151–170

Poale Zion
Jewish political parties
Jewish communist movements
Jews and Judaism in the Soviet Union
Political parties established in 1921
Jewish groups in Lithuania
Jewish groups in Belarus
Secular Jewish culture in Europe